The Viperinae, or viperines, are a subfamily of vipers endemic to Europe, Asia and Africa. They are distinguished by their lack of the heat-sensing pit organs that characterize their sister group, the subfamily Crotalinae. Currently, 13 genera are recognized. Most are tropical and subtropical, although one species, Vipera berus, even occurs within the Arctic Circle. Like all vipers, they are venomous.

The common names "pitless vipers", "true vipers", "Old World vipers", and "true adders" all refer to this group.

Description
Most species are terrestrial, but a few, such as those of the genus Atheris, are completely arboreal.

Although the heat-sensing pits that characterize the Crotalinae are clearly lacking in the viperines, a supernasal sac with sensory function has been described in a number of species. This sac is an invagination of the skin between the supranasal and nasal scales and is connected to the ophthalmic branch of the trigeminal nerve. The nerve endings here resemble those in the labial pits of boas. The supernasal sac is present in the genera Daboia, Pseudocerastes and Causus, but is especially well developed in the genus Bitis. Experiments have shown that strikes are not only guided by visual and chemical cues, but also by heat, with warmer targets being struck more frequently than colder ones.

Geographic range
Viperinae are found in Europe, Asia, and Africa, but not in Madagascar.

Reproduction
Generally, members of this subfamily are ovoviviparous, although a few, such as Pseudocerastes, Cerastes, and some Echis species are oviparous (egg-laying).

Genera

Taxonomy
Until relatively recently, two other genera were also included in the Viperinae.  However, they were eventually considered so distinctive within the Viperidae, that separate subfamilies were created for them:

 Genus Azemiops - moved to subfamily Azemiopinae by Liem, Marx & Rabb (1971).
 Genus Causus - recognition of subfamily Causinae Cope, 1860 was proposed by Groombridge (1987) and further supported by Cadle (1992).

Nevertheless, these groups, together with the genera currently recognized as belonging to the Viperinae, are still often referred to collectively as the true vipers.

Broadley (1996) recognized a new tribe, Atherini, for the genera Atheris, Adenorhinos, Montatheris and Proatheris, the type genus for which is Atheris.

See also
 List of viperine species and subspecies

References

Further reading

 Breidenbach CH. 1990. Thermal Cues Influence Strikes in Pitless Vipers. Journal of Herpetology 4: 448–450.
 Broadley DG. 1996. A review of the tribe Atherini (Serpentes: Viperidae), with the descriptions of two new genera. African Journal of Herpetology 45 (2): 40–48.
 Cantor TE. 1847. Catalogue of Reptiles Inhabiting the Malayan Peninsula and Islands. Journal of the Asiatic Society of Bengal, Calcutta 16 (2): 607–656, 897–952, 1026-1078 [1040].
 Cuvier G. 1817. Le règne animal distribué d'après son organisation, pour servir de base à l'histoire naturelle des animaux det d'introduction à l'anatomie comparée. Tome II, contenant les reptiles, les poissons, les mollusques et les annélidés. Paris: Déterville. xviii + 532 pp. [80].
 Eichwald, E. 1831. Zoologia specialis, quam expositis animalibus tum vivis, tum fossilibus potissimuni rossiae in universum, et poloniae in specie, in usum lectionum publicarum in Universitate Caesarea Vilnensi. Vilnius: Zawadski. 3: 404 pp. [371].
 Fitzinger LJFJ. 1826. Neue classification der reptilien nach ihren natürlichen verwandtschaften. Nebst einer verwandtschafts-tafel und einem verzeichnisse der reptilien-sammlung des K. K. zoologischen museum's zu Wien. Vienna: J.G. Hübner. vii + 66 pp. [11].
 Gray JE. 1825. A Synopsis of the Genera of Reptiles and Amphibia, with a Description of some New Species. Annals of Philosophy, New Series, 10: 193-217 [205].
 Günther ACLG. 1864. The Reptiles of British India. London: Ray Society. xxvii + 452 pp. [383].
 Latreille PA. 1825. Familles naturelles du règne animal, exposés succinctement et dans un ordre analytique, avec l'indication de leurs genres. Paris: Baillière. 570 pp. [102].
 Lynn WG. 1931. The Structure and Function of the Facial Pit of the Pit Vipers. American Journal of Anatomy 49: 97.
 Oppel M. 1811. Mémoire sur la classification des reptiles. Ordre II. Reptiles à écailles. Section II. Ophidiens. Annales du Musée National d'Histoire Naturelle, Paris 16: 254–295, 376–393. [376, 378, 389].
 Strauch A. 1869. "Synopsis der Viperiden: nebst Bemerkungen über die geographische Verbreitung dieser Giftschlangen-Familie". Mémoires de l'Académie impériale des sciences de St.-Pétersbourg. 7e série. 14 (6): 1–114 [19]. 

 
Taxa named by Nicolaus Michael Oppel
Snake subfamilies